Monument Square Historic District may refer to:

 Monument Square Historic District (Charlestown, Boston, Massachusetts), location of the Bunker Hill Monument
 Monument Square Historic District (Jamaica Plain, Boston, Massachusetts)
 Monument Square Historic District (Leominster, Massachusetts), listed on the NRHP in Massachusetts
 Monument Square-Eagle Street Historic District North Adams, Massachusetts, listed on the NRHP in Massachusetts
 Monument Square Historic District (Alton, New Hampshire), listed on the NRHP in Belknap County, New Hampshire

See also
 Urbana Monument Square Historic District, Urbana, Ohio